When Red is Black is Qiu Xiaolong's third Inspector Chen mystery and provides an insightful look into modern China.

Plot summary 
When the murder of a woman is reported to the Shanghai police while Inspector Chen is on vacation, Sergeant Yu is forced to take charge of the investigation. The victim, Yin Lige, a novelist known for her banned book, has been found dead in her tiny, humble room off the stairwell of a converted multi-family house. It seems that only a neighbor could have committed the crime, for the building is kept locked at night. But there is no apparent motive. Sergeant Yu tries to unravel the reclusive woman's past and begins to realize it may have larger political implications. The Cultural Revolution might be more than 30 years in the past, but its effects can still be felt at every level of Chinese society.

This is the third critically acclaimed Inspector Chen mystery set in post-Cultural Revolution China.

Literary review 
When Red Is Black offers a complex and riveting portrait of Shanghai, a city in transition from a proletarian dictatorship to a capitalist playground where "nostalgia sells". The larger and more disquieting mystery of what will happen to dutiful workers like Detective Yu and Chief Inspector Chen as Chinese society continues to change is necessarily left unsolved.

References

2004 American novels
Novels by Qiu Xiaolong
Novels set in China